The Thruxton Jackaroo was a 1950s British four-seat cabin biplane converted from a de Havilland Tiger Moth by Jackaroo Aircraft Limited at Thruxton Aerodrome and Rollason Aircraft and Engines Limited at Croydon Airport.

History
The Thruxton Jackaroo was designed as a four-seat cabin general purpose biplane, the original tandem two-seat Tiger Moth fuselage was widened to allow side-by-side seating for 4 people. It was marketed as "the cheapest four-seat aircraft in the world". The first conversion first flew on 2 March 1957. Eighteen Tiger Moths were converted by Jackaroo Aircraft Limited between 1957 and 1959 and one aircraft was converted by Rollason's in 1960. The aircraft could be fitted with an optional crop spraying gear. One converted aircraft was further modified as a single-seat agricultural aircraft, but with little interest in the variant the aircraft was converted back to a Mk. 1.

Variants

Jackaroo Mk 1
Production cabin biplane with wooden canopy.
Jackaroo Mk 2
Single-seat Agricultural variant with either a hopper or 60-gal tank in place of the two front seats, one conversion.
Jackaroo Mk 3
Production cabin biplane with metal canopy and provision for brakes.

Specifications

See also

References

 

1950s British civil utility aircraft
De Havilland aircraft
Biplanes
Single-engined tractor aircraft
Aircraft first flown in 1957